This is a list of wars involving Gabon.

References

Gabon

Wars